Yleisradio Oy (Finnish, literally "General Radio Ltd." or "General Broadcast Ltd."; abbr. Yle), translated to English as the Finnish Broadcasting Company, is Finland's national public broadcasting company, founded in 1926. It is a joint-stock company which is 99.98% owned by the Finnish state, and employs around 3,200 people in Finland. Yle shares many of its organizational characteristics with its British counterpart, the BBC, on which it was largely modeled.

Yle was long funded by revenues obtained from a broadcast receiving license fee payable by the owners of radio sets (1927–76) and television sets (1958–2012), as well as receiving a portion of the broadcasting license fees payable by private television broadcasters. Since 2013, the license fee has been replaced by a public broadcasting tax (known as the Yle tax), collected annually from private individuals and corporations together with their other taxes.

By far the largest part of the Yle tax is collected from individual taxpayers, with payments assessed on a sliding scale. Minors and those with an annual income less than €7,813 are exempt. At the lower limit the tax payable by individuals is €50 per annum and the maximum (payable by an individual with a yearly income of €20,588 or more) is €140. The rationale for the abolition of the television license fee was the development of other means of delivering Yle's services, such as the Internet, and the consequent impracticality of continuing to tie the fee to the ownership of a specific device. Yle receives no advertising revenue, as all channels are advertisement-free.

Yle has a status that could be described as that of a non-departmental public body. It is governed by a parliamentary governing council. Yle's turnover in 2010 was €398.4 million. In 2018, Yle's annual budget was about €530 million.

Yle operates three national television channels, 13 radio channels and services, and 25 regional radio stations. As Finland is constitutionally bilingual—around 5.5% of the population speaks Swedish as their mother tongue—Yle provides radio and TV programming in Swedish through its Swedish-language department, Svenska Yle. As is customary in Finnish television and cinemas, foreign films and TV programs, as well as segments of local programs that feature foreign language dialogues (e.g. news interviews), are generally subtitled on Yle's channels. Dubbing is used in cartoons intended for young children who have not yet learned to read; off-screen narration in documentaries is also frequently dubbed.

In the field of international broadcasting, one of Yle's best-known services was Nuntii Latini, the news in Latin, which was broadcast worldwide and made available on the Internet.

Yle was one of 23 founding broadcasting organizations of the European Broadcasting Union in 1950. It hosted the Eurovision Song Contest 2007 in Helsinki.

History 

Suomen Yleisradio (Finland's General Radio) was founded in Helsinki on 29 May 1926. The first radio program was transmitted on 9 September that year, the date generally considered the birthday of regular broadcasting activities in Finland. Not until 1928 did Yle's broadcasts became available throughout the country. By the beginning of the 1930s, 100,000 households could listen to Yle programs.

In 1957, Yle made its first television broadcast tests, and regular TV programming started the next year under the name Suomen Televisio (Finland's Television), which was later renamed Yle TV1. Television's popularity in the country grew rapidly. In 1964, Yle obtained TES-TV and Tamvisio, which were merged to Yle TV2. In 1969, the Finnish Broadcasting Company began broadcasting television programs in color, but due to the high cost of technology, color became standard only in the late 1970s. On May 1, 1977, Tv-uutiset (~ TV-news) and TV-nytt switched to color.

In the 2000s, Yle founded a number of new radio and television channels. In 2007, there was a digital television switchover. A completely new digital channel, Yle Teema (~ Yle Theme) was introduced, and the Swedish-language FST (Finlands Svenska Television, ~ Finland's Swedish Television) was moved from reserved analogue channel time to its own digital channel YLE FST5, which was later renamed Yle Fem. In addition to these four channels (TV1, TV2, Teema, and Fem), a fifth channel, YLE24, was launched in 2001 for 24-hour news programming. This channel was replaced by YLE Extra, a channel attempting to cater to the youth, which was in turn decommissioned in 2007. Until 4 August 2008, the fifth channel was used to broadcast Yle TV1 with Finnish subtitles broadcast on programs in foreign languages (without having to enable the TV's or digital set-top box's subtitle function).

Logo history

Television 

 Yle TV1: TV1 is Yle's oldest channel and its flagship TV channel. It serves as Yle's main news, current affairs and factual journalism outlet, and also broadcasts documentaries, drama, cultural, and educational programs. Satirical entertainment, cinema, and shows of British production are also included in its programming. The channel's headquarters are in Helsinki.

 Yle TV2: TV2, founded in 1964, is the main channel for sports programs and children's and teenagers' broadcasting. The channel also broadcasts drama, entertainment, and factual programs. Emphasis in current affairs output is on domestic items, regional content and citizen journalism. The channel's headquarters are in Tampere.

 Yle Teema & Fem: Yle Teema & Fem (~ Yle Theme & Five) combines the operations of the previously separate Teema and Fem channels. Teema & Fem is Yle's channel for culture, education, and science. It focuses on recordings of performing arts, classical music, art, and history documentaries, films, and theme broadcasts. The channel also broadcasts Swedish-language full-service channel broadcasting news, factual and children's programs and entertainment. It also shows many Nordic films and series and Sami-language Ođđasat. Finnish subtitles are available for most programs; they can be enabled using the digital set-top box. Outside prime time, Teema & Fem shows selected broadcasts from Sveriges Television, Sweden's equivalent of Yle.

 TV Finland: TV Finland is a digital satellite channel showing a selection of Yle's programs in Sweden.

 Yle Text-TV: Yle Text-TV shows news, sport and program information around the clock. Theme pages on the weather, traffic, work and leisure.

As of January 2014, all of Yle's TV-channels except TV Finland are available in high definition.

Radio 

 : A radio channel for culture, in-depth current affairs, and other speech-based programmes. Classical music (concerts by the Finnish Radio Symphony Orchestra), jazz, folk, world music, and religious music also feature.
 YleX: A fast-tempo programme-flow channel featuring new music and in tune with popular culture, targeted at 17- to 27-year-olds. The percentage of music is 70%. New domestic and foreign pop and rock and several special music programmes.
 Yle Radio Suomi: The national and regional news, service and contact channel, also sport and entertainment. Musical fare comprising domestic and foreign hits, adult and nostalgic pop.
  (formerly Yle Radio Peili): The news and current affairs channel presenting talk programmes from Yle's other radio and television channels. Classical jazz. Also broadcast on digital television.
 Yle X3M: The Swedish-language youth channel for current affairs debate and popular culture, broadcasting also news. New pop and rock and special music programmes.
 Yle Vega: News, current affairs and culture in Swedish for all audience groups, also offering culture and regional programmes. Adult pop, jazz and classical music.
 Yle Sámi Radio: A Sami-language network covering most of Lapland. Produced in co-operation with SVT and NRK.

Digital services
Yle phased out digital audio broadcasts by the end of 2005.  Three channels  continued to be available as DVB audio services. DVB audio services were shut down on 30 June 2016.
 : The 24-hour digital supplementary service of classical music also broadcast on digital television.

International services
 : Broadcasts in English and other languages, mostly compiled from international radio services. Yle Mondo is available on FM in Helsinki and throughout the country as an audio attached to digital TV.

Yle tax 

Until the end of 2012, Finnish citizens paid Yle a license fee for the use of a television, set at 252 euros per year in 2012. The license fee was per location, which could hold several sets (e.g. in a living room as well as a bedroom). The public broadcasting tax, also known as the Yle tax, replaced the license fee in 2013. The tax ranges from 50 euros to 140 euros per person and per year, depending on income. Minors and persons with low income are exempt from the tax.

Controversies 

In radio, Yle was a legal monopoly until 1985, when local radio stations were permitted, and maintained a national monopoly until 1995, when national radio networks were allowed.

In the past, Yle has been seen in Finland as a "red" or leftist medium. This was true especially in 1965–69, during the term of Director-General Eino S. Repo, who got the position with the backing of the Agrarian League and President Kekkonen (a member of the Agrarian Party), as he was Kekkonen's personal friend. He was accused of favoring leftist student radicalism and young, left-leaning reporters with programs critical of capitalism that demanded reforms to bring Finland closer to the Soviet Union, and Yle was given the nickname "Reporadio". After Repo resigned, he was demoted to director of radio broadcasting, on the communist-led People's Democratic League mandate.

Repo resigned in 1969, but according to Yle, the "political mandate" remained, as Erkki Raatikainen was named director directly from the Social Democratic Party office. All directors after him until 2010 were Social Democrats. This was ended by appointment of the right-wing National Coalition Party's Lauri Kivinen as director in 2010.

During Finlandization and the leftist radicalization of the 1970s, Yle contributed to Kekkonen's policy of "neutrality" by broadcasting the program Näin naapurissa about the Soviet Union. This program was produced in cooperation with the Soviets and supported Soviet propaganda without criticism.

Kivinen's appointment in 2010 received much criticism, as he was previously head of Nokia Siemens Networks, which had sold monitoring equipment to the Iranian Ministry of Intelligence, allowing them to arrest political dissidents throughout the protests in the fall of 2009.

English-language newscaster Kimmo Wilska was fired on 13 August 2010 after pretending to be caught drinking on camera following an alcohol-related news story on Yle News. His stunt was not well received by Yle management, which fired him that day. Wilska received substantial support after his termination.

Yle has been criticized for buying many HBO series. It has responded by emphasizing the suitability of series to channels with no ad breaks, citing HBO programming's quality and low price, and stating that American programs constitute only 7% of its programming.

Decision to close shortwave
The broadcasts on shortwave from Yle Radio Finland were closed at the end of 2006. Expatriate organisations had been campaigning for a continued service, but their efforts did not succeed in maintaining the service or even in slowing the process. The decision also affected a high-powered medium wave on 963 kHz (312m). A smaller medium wave covering the Gulf of Finland region (558 kHz, 538m) remained on air one more year.

Parliamentary question about shortwave
In November 2005, MP Pertti Hemmilä (N) submitted a question in Parliament about the plans of Yle to end its availability on international shortwave bands. In his question, Hemmilä took up the low cost of the world band radio to the consumer travelling or living abroad. In her response the Minister of Transport and Communications, Susanna Huovinen (S) noted that Yle would now be available via other means, such as satellites and the Internet. She also underlined the fact that Yle is not under government control, but under indirect parliamentary supervision.

YLE Gate 2017 
The Council for Mass Media in Finland criticized Yleisradio for restricting news reports about Prime Minister Juha Sipilä's investments and business in 2017. The chief editor of Yle threatened that Yle would resign from the Council. PM Sipilä had been angry over Yle reports on the Talvivaara mine and Ketera Steel (a company owned by relatives of Sipilä). Several reporters were barred from publishing stories about of political connections between Sipilä and companies owned by his relatives, and state financing of the Talvivaara mine (Terrafame mine).

List of YLE  directors 

L. M. Viherjuuri, 1926–1927 (acting)
Yrjö Koskelainen, 1927 (acting)
Armas Deinert, 1927 (acting)
 Hjalmar Woldemar Walldén (since 1935 Jalmar Voldemar Vakio)  1927–1945
Hella Wuolijoki, 1945–1949
Einar Sundström, 1950–1964
Eino S. Repo, 1965–1969
Erkki Raatikainen, 1970–1979
Sakari Kiuru, 1980–1989
Reino Paasilinna, 1990–1994
Arne Wessberg, 1994–2005
Mikael Jungner, 2005–2010
Lauri Kivinen, 2010–2018
Merja Ylä-Anttila, 2018–in office

Notable news anchors
Marjo Rein
Matti Rönkä
Tommy Franti
Jussi-Pekka Rantanen
Arto Nurmi
Marjukka Havumäki
Piia Pasanen

See also 
 List of radio stations in Finland
 Television in Finland
 Media of Finland

References

External links 

  
 About Yle in English
 Svenska.yle.fi – Svenska Yle. Official site in Swedish
 Yle News – News in English
 Yle Sápmi –  News in Sámi (Lappish)
 Yle Novosti – News in Russian
 Nuntii Latini – News in Latin
 Yle Areena – in Finnish
 Yle Arenan – in Swedish
 Yle Elävä arkisto – the Living Archive in Finnish
 Yle Arkivet – the Archive in Swedish

 
Publicly funded broadcasters
European Broadcasting Union members
Commercial-free television networks
Mass media companies of Finland
Radio stations established in 1926
Television in Finland
Companies based in Helsinki
State media
1926 establishments in Finland
Finnish news websites